Saltaro was the son of Constantine I of Logudoro. His mother is unknown, it may have been Marcusa. Whether or not he is the same person as the "Saltaro de Gunale" pretender to the throne of Logudoro in 1127 during the reign of Gonario II is unknown.

While still a young man, he took part in the 1113–1115 Pisan expedition against the Moors of the Balearic Islands in 1114–1115. He was renowned for his handling of the ships and his participation brought honour to his father.

Sources
Manno, Giuseppe (1835). Storia di Sardegna. P.M. Visaj.

12th-century deaths
Christians of the 1113–1115 Balearic Islands expedition
Judges (judikes) of Logudoro
Year of birth unknown